Golden skink is a vernacular name for some smallish skink species from tropical Asia:

 Eutropis carinata (Keeled Indian Mabuya)
 Eutropis multifasciata (East Indian Brown Mabuya)

Animal common name disambiguation pages